Vitor Teixeira (born 22 January 1958) is a Brazilian equestrian. He competed at the 1984 Summer Olympics, the 1988 Summer Olympics and the 1992 Summer Olympics.

References

1958 births
Living people
Brazilian male equestrians
Olympic equestrians of Brazil
Equestrians at the 1984 Summer Olympics
Equestrians at the 1988 Summer Olympics
Equestrians at the 1992 Summer Olympics
Sportspeople from Belo Horizonte
Pan American Games medalists in equestrian
Pan American Games gold medalists for Brazil
Equestrians at the 1991 Pan American Games
Medalists at the 1991 Pan American Games
Pan American Games bronze medalists for Brazil
21st-century Brazilian people
20th-century Brazilian people